Pano Kivides is a village in the Limassol District of Cyprus, located 10 km north of Erimi. Pano Kivides that '80 moved to the current location.

References

Communities in Limassol District